Puelo Bajo Airport,  is an airport serving Puelo Bajo (es), a village in the Los Lagos Region of Chile. The village is near the Puelo River, which flows into the Reloncaví Sound.

There are hills north and south of the runway.

See also

Transport in Chile
List of airports in Chile

References

External links
OpenStreetMap - Puelo Bajo
OurAirports - Puelo Bajo
SkyVector - Puelo Bajo

Airports in Chile
Airports in Los Lagos Region